Pablo Andrés González (born 28 May 1985) is an Argentine footballer who plays as a forward for Italian  club Novara. He is the younger brother of Mariano González.

Career
A youth product of Racing Club de Avellaneda, González moved to Europe in 2007 for his first time to join Swiss club FC Locarno on loan. After a lone but successful season with Grupo Universitario de Tandil, González moved to Italy and signed with Lega Pro Prima Divisione club Novara, immediately becoming a mainstay for the club in its triumphant campaign ended with promotion in June 2010.

González's second season at Novara saw him performing as one of the top strikers in the Serie B league and assured him a growing reputation, and his performances led to interest from various Serie A and high-profile Serie B clubs; on 13 January 2011 Palermo chairman Maurizio Zamparini confirmed the signing of González from Novara, effective from 1 July. On 31 January 2010 Palermo officially announced the signing of González (later announced the fee was €5 million), who was allowed to complete the season on loan at Novara, in a bid that included co-ownerships of rosanero players Samir Ujkani and Michel Morganella (both tagged for €1.5M) and €2 million cash.
He concluded the season with 45 appearances: 38 in the league, 4 in the promotion play–off and 2 in the Coppa Italia. He scored 15 goals: 14 in the league and 1 in the promotion play–off against Padova. Novara is promoted to Serie A after 55 years of absence.
In the summer he moved to Palermo. It marked the debut rosanero, 4 August 2011, in the Europa League against Thun.

On 31 August 2011 he moved on loan to Siena for €100,000  (discounted in order to compensate the signing of Milan Milanović), with option to sign for €2.8 million (or €1.4 million for half). He made his Serie A debut on 11 September 2011, against Catania.

On 22 June 2012, Palermo announced to have sold González back to Novara in a permanent deal, for €3 million, at the same time Morganella and Ujkani returned to Palermo also for €3 million.

In the summer of 2016 he signed a four-year contract with Alessandria.

On 14 December 2018 he joined Novara for the third time.

Career statistics

References

External links
 Pablo Andrés González at BDFA.com.ar 
 Profile at Gazzetta.it 

1985 births
Living people
People from Tandil
Sportspeople from Buenos Aires Province
Argentine footballers
Association football forwards
Argentine Primera División players
Torneo Argentino B players
Racing Club de Avellaneda footballers
Grupo Universitario de Tandil players
Swiss Challenge League players
FC Locarno players
Serie A players
Serie B players
Serie C players
Serie D players
Novara F.C. players
Palermo F.C. players
A.C.N. Siena 1904 players
U.S. Alessandria Calcio 1912 players
Argentine expatriate footballers
Argentine expatriate sportspeople in Switzerland
Argentine expatriate sportspeople in Italy
Expatriate footballers in Switzerland
Expatriate footballers in Italy}